The Ermatinger Clergue National Historic Site is a historic site and museum located in Sault Ste. Marie, Ontario, Canada.

Site
There are three buildings on the site: the Ermatinger Old Stone House, the Clergue Blockhouse, and the Heritage Discovery Centre. The Ermatinger and Clergue houses are thought to the be oldest buildings northwest of Toronto. The Heritage Discovery Centre's construction was completed in 2014, this space was designed to provide additional interpretive and programming space for the historic site.

The site is managed by the city of Sault Ste. Marie, Ontario.

Ermatinger Old Stone House 

The Ermatinger Old Stone House is the original building on the site, was constructed between 1814 and 1823, and is considered one of the oldest surviving houses in Northern Ontario. It was built by former North West Company fur trader Charles Oakes Ermatinger, who lived in the home with his wife and children. He resided there until 1828, when he cut his ties in Sault Ste. Marie after the death of his brother Frederick William. It was designated as a national historic site in 1957.

The house is constructed from local stone and timber, and faces the St. Mary's River. It was considered big for its time, and was an imposing landmark at the time of its construction. After the Ermatinger family left, the house was used by its succeeding occupants as a mission, hotel, tavern, courthouse, post office, dance hall, tea room and apartment building. The house was bought by the City of Sault Ste. Marie in 1965 and was restored before opening to the public as a house museum.

Sault Ste. Marie historian  McNeice began researching the history of the Ermatinger Old Stone House and the Ermatinger family in 1956. This work would ultimately result in the publication of a book titled, The Ermatinger Family of Sault Ste. Marie which was published posthumously by McNeice's daughter.

Clergue blockhouse 

The Clergue blockhouse was originally a powder magazine at a North West Company trading post before the merger of the North West Company and the Hudson's Bay Company. When the last remaining factor at the post resigned in 1867 the site fell into disuse, until only the powder magazine's foundation building remained. American industrialist F.H. Clergue then purchased the property and began the process of transforming it from powder magazine to living space. He lived in the blockhouse from 1894 to 1902.

In 1979 the blockhouse was designated as a local historical site by the City of Sault Ste. Marie, Ontario. In 1995 the St. Mary's Paper Mill was planning development which would jeopardize the location and structure of the blockhouse. The following year the building was purchased by the City of Sault Ste. Marie and relocated from its original site at the St. Mary's Paper Mill to the Ermatinger Old Stone House site.

References

External links 

Museums in Sault Ste. Marie, Ontario
National Historic Sites in Ontario
Buildings and structures in Sault Ste. Marie, Ontario